George Gerard Jablonski (July 18, 1919 – June 1, 1992), whose last name is often misspelled as Jablonsky, was an American professional basketball player. He played for the Sheboygan Red Skins in the National Basketball League during the 1942–43 season, averaged 1.7 points per game, and won the league championship. He also coached high school basketball at Cathedral High School in Milwaukee, Wisconsin for two years.

References

External links
 University of Milwaukee Hall of Fame profile

1919 births
1992 deaths
United States Army personnel of World War II
American men's basketball players
Basketball coaches from Wisconsin
Basketball players from Milwaukee
Centers (basketball)
High school basketball coaches in Wisconsin
Milwaukee Panthers football players
Milwaukee Panthers men's basketball players
Sheboygan Red Skins players
Sportspeople from Milwaukee